Ballinderry Shamrocks GAC is a Gaelic Athletic Association club based in Ballinderry, County Londonderry, Northern Ireland. The club is a member of the Derry GAA and cater for gaelic football and camogie.

The club's biggest success was winning the 2002 All-Ireland Senior Club Football Championship. They have won the Ulster Senior Club Football Championship three times and won the Derry Senior Football Championship on 11 occasions.

Journalist and former Derry player Joe Brolly described Ballinderry as "one of the great communities of Ireland".

2019 Championship Football

2018 Championship Football

2017 Championship Football

2016 Championship Football

 Match Info Source derrygaa.ie

History

Gaelic football 
Records show that by 1896 Gaelic football and the Gaelic League were organised in Ballinderry. In 1915 Ballinderry competed in what was generally known as the Killybearn League. Other teams competing were Moneymore, Mullinahoe (part of Ardboe), Drumaney (part of Ardboe), Drummullan, Killybearn and Stewartstown. Up to 1919 Bellagherty, a townland of Ballinderry had their own team.

1924 witnessed a revival of Gaelic football in South Londonderry through the efforts of Father Downey C.C., who was assisted by Master Wallace (Ballinderry), Master O’Brien (Magherafelt), Hugh A. Mullan and J.J. McNally. Other teams in South Londonderry at the time included Lissan, Magherafelt, Newbridge, Gulladuff and Glenullin (now a North Derry club).

By 1926 Ballinderry officially formed as one team representing all the townlands of Ballinderry. The club was named Ballinderry Shamrocks GAC. A year later the side claimed their first Derry Championship, after a final victory over Drumsurn.

In the late 1920s and early 1930s Ballinderry competed in the Tyrone league and Championship. Gaelic football was once again revived in South Londonderry in 1933 and Ballinderry returned to compete in Derry competitions.

From 1933 to 1936 Ballylifford, another townland of Ballinderry competed as a separate team. When Ballylifford and Ballinderry met this meant brother against brother in some cases. In 1938 a parish league was formed (between five Ballinderry teams): Bellagherty, St. John's, Ballinderry, Derrychrin and Mullan Fianna. Mullan were the eventual winners, the prize being a trip to the All-Ireland Final. Mullan Fianna competed as Ballinderry's sole team for a few years, but the Ballinderry Shamrocks side soon restarted in the early 1940s.

The club moved to their current ground (Shamrock Park) in 1971. It was officially opened in 1979 with an Ulster U-21 Football Championship semi-final between Derry and Down. After a gap of 47 years, 1974 saw Ballinderry win their second Derry Senior Championship, defeating Banagher in the final. The early 1980s were a glory period for the club and became only the second side after Bellaghy to win the Derry Championship three years in a row (1980, 1981 and 1982). The club beat Burren of Down to claim the 1981 Ulster Senior Club Football Championship, before losing by a point to Garrymore (Mayo) in the All-Ireland Club Championship semi-final.

The club won another county championship in 1995, defeating rivals Bellaghy at Watty Graham Park, Maghera. The Shamrocks were beaten narrowly by Bellaghy in the Derry final in both 1999 and 2000. The two clubs clashed again in the 2001 final. This time Ballinderry were victorious. They went on to victory over Mayobridge in the Ulster Senior Club Football Championship decider. Ballinderry went on to reach the 2001/02 All-Ireland Senior Club Football Championship, which they won defeating Tír Chonaill Gaels (London) in the quarter-final, Rathnew (Wicklow) in the semi-final and Nemo Rangers (Cork) in the final on a scoreline of 2–10 (16 points) to 0–9 (9 points). The club were awarded Derry Club of the Year in 2001 under the AIB GAA Club of the Year Awards scheme Club Chairman Michael Donnelly was presented the award by GAA President Seán McCague. Ballinderry also won Club of the Year at the 2002 Ulster GAA Writer's Association Awards.

The club defended their Derry Championship crown in 2002, with victory over An Lúb in the final, but lost disappointingly to Errigal Ciarán in the Ulster semi-final. Ballinderry won their ninth Derry Championship in 2006 after a gap of four years and reached the Ulster Club final. State of the art floodlights were installed at Shamrock Park in September 2007, replacing the older floodlights. Derry played St. Mary's University College at Shamrock Park in the 2008 Dr. McKenna Cup, believed to be the first inter-county competition game played at the venue. The Shamrocks regained the Derry Championship in 2008 – the club's tenth title.

Camogie 
In 2003 the club's dedication and commitment was recognised when they obtained the Junior Clubmark demonstrating the strong policies and practices which are in place to ensure safe quality sporting opportunities for young people. Following this award, the under-age teams proved that the club were worthy winners by winning the Under 14, 16 and 18 county championships. The club won the Golden Clubmark in 2006.

In 2004 the Shamrocks club was awarded the prestige Irish News Ulster Club award for commitment to under-age teams and coaching.

Football titles

Senior 
All-Ireland Senior Club Football Championship: 1
2002

All-Ireland Kilmacud Crokes Sevens Championship: 1
1998.

Ulster Senior Club Football Championship: 3
1981, 2001, 2013

Ulster Senior Club Football League: 3
2008, 2010, 2011
Derry Senior Football Championship: 12
1927, 1974, 1980, 1981, 1982, 1995, 2001, 2002, 2006, 2008, 2011, 2012, 2013

Derry Senior Football League: 11
1974, 1975, 1980, 1992, 1993, 1995, 1996, 1997, 2005, 2006, 2007
Derry Junior Football Championship: 1
1993 (won by Ballinderry Thirds team)
Larkin Cup ?*
2006, 2007, 2008, 2017
McGlinchey Cup ?*
2004.
Bishops Cup ?*
1989.

Reserves 
Derry Reserve Football Championship: 9
1976, 1996, 1997, 1999, 2001, 2003, 2005, 2006, 2007
Derry Reserve Football League: 9
1976, 1977, 1978, 1996, 1997, 1999, 2001, 2003, 2006
Graham Cup 3*
1976, 1977, 2006. 2009

Under-21 
Derry Under-21 Football Championship: 1
1999.

Minor 
Ulster Minor Club Football Championship: 4
1996, 1997, 2001, 2008.
Derry Minor Football Championship: 7
1989, 1996, 1997, 2001, 2002, 2003, 2008.
Derry Minor Football League: 7*
1952, 1997, 1998, 2001, 2002, 2005, 2008

Under-16 
 Ulster Under-16 Club Football Championship: 4
 1996, 1997, 1998, 1999.
 Derry Under-16 Football Championship: 9
 1961, 1994, 1996, 1997, 1998, 1999, 2000, 2001, 2008, 2012
 South Derry Under-16 Football Championship: 9*
 1961, 1994, 1996, 1997, 1998, 1999, 2000, 2002.
 South Derry Under-16 Football League: 8*
 1994, 1995, 1996, 1997, 1999, 2000, 2001, 2006.

Under-15 
Derry Under-15 Football Championship: 3*
1961, 2004, 2005.
Ulster Óg Sport: 1*
2004?
Derry Óg Sport: 4
1993, 1998, 2004, 2007

Under-14 
 All-Ireland Féile na nÓg: 3
  *1996, 1997, 2018
 Ulster Féile na nÓg: 1
 2004.
 Derry Féile na nÓg: 11
 1990, 1991, 1992, 1993, 1995, 1996, 1997, 1999, 2000, 2004, 2006, 2018.
 Derry Under-14 Football Championship: 10*
 1981, 1990, 1991, 1992, 1993, 1994, 1996, 1997, 1999, 2006.
 South Derry Under-14 Football Championship: 12*
 1977, 1990, 1991, 1992, 1993, 1994, 1996, 1997, 1998, 1999, 2000, 2006.
 South Derry Under-14 Football League: 11*
 1990, 1991, 1992, 1993, 1994, 1995, 1996, 1997, 1999, 2000, 2006.

Under-12 
Derry Under-12 Football League & Championship: 10*
1987, 1988, 1989, 1990, 1991, 1992, 1993, 1997, 2002, 2004.

* Note: Some honours, particularly those marked with * may be incomplete lists. Please add in any other honours you know of.

Notable players
 Coilin Devlin
 Enda Muldoon – All Star winning Derry footballer.
 Conleith Gilligan (c)
 Declan Bateson – Member of Derry's 1993 All-Ireland winning panel.

See also 
Derry Senior Football Championship
List of Gaelic games clubs in Derry

References

 Official Ballinderry website article on History

External links
Ballinderry Shamrocks Website
Article on Ballinderry by Joe Brolly

Gaelic football clubs in County Londonderry
Gaelic games clubs in County Londonderry